The 1966 Lowood 4 Hour was an endurance race for production sedans held at the Lowood circuit in Queensland, Australia on 27 March 1966. The race, which was organised by the Queensland Racing Drivers Club, was the third annual Lowood 4 Hour. It was open to cars priced under $6000 in Australia, provided that 100 examples of the model had been manufacturered.

The 34 starters competed in four classes based on vehicle retail price with an additional class for cars with automatic transmission. Class winning cars were Morris Mini Deluxe, Morris Cooper, Ford Cortina GT500, Volvo 122S and Holden HD X2 179. Officially, only class placings were recognised but the unofficial "line honours" winner was the Scuderia Veloce entered Volvo 122S driven by David McKay and Bill Orr. Initial reports had the Firth / Seton Ford Cortina GT500 listed as taking line honours, but this was later corrected.

Results

Notes & references

Lowood 4 Hour
Lowood 4 Hour